Grażyna Dudek (born 20 August 1960 in Katowice) is a Polish former competitive figure skater. She competed at the 1976 Winter Olympics, three World Championships, and four European Championships. She is a five-time (1974–1978) Polish national champion.

Competitive highlights

References 

1960 births
Polish female single skaters
Olympic figure skaters of Poland
Living people
Sportspeople from Katowice
Figure skaters at the 1976 Winter Olympics